HalloweeNight is a 2009 American horror film that was directed by Mark Polonia of the Polonia brothers, an indie film duo, and longtime collaborator Matt Satterly.

Plot
A school janitor devises an evil scarecrow to exact revenge on those who have tormented him, but then loses control of his fiendish creation.

Cast
 Cindy Wheeler
 Todd Carpenter
 Ken Van Sant
 Brian Berry
 Bob Dennis
 Dave Fife
 Matt Satterly
 S.A. Diasparra

Production

Made on a budget of $4,000, this film marks the first created by Polonia Brothers Entertainment since the death of John Polonia. The movie based on a screenplay by John Polonia dedicated to the memory of him.

Release
The film was released on October 8, 2009 by Cinegraphic Productions and Polonia Bros. Entertainment.

References

External links
 

2009 direct-to-video films
2009 horror films
2009 independent films
2009 psychological thriller films
2009 films
Halloween horror films
American independent films
American slasher films
2000s slasher films
Films directed by Mark Polonia
2000s English-language films
2000s American films